Idanophana gephyra is a species of ulidiid or picture-winged fly in the genus Idanophana of the family Ulidiidae.

References

Ulidiidae